Girls on Top is a British sitcom, broadcast on ITV in 1985 and 1986, and made by Allan McKeown's Witzend Productions for the ITV contractor Central Independent Television. It starred Dawn French, Jennifer Saunders, Ruby Wax and Tracey Ullman with Joan Greenwood. It was written by French, Saunders, and Wax, with additional material for two episodes written by Ullman.

The show focused on four female flatmates and their landlady. It was a female version of The Young Ones, two series of which were made in 1982 and 1984. French and Saunders had both appeared in The Young Ones and, like most of its stars, were members of The Comic Strip.

Synopsis
The first episode had a woman in her early 20s named Amanda struggling to find a flat and managing to procure one (that she cannot afford) from Lady Carlton. The previous resident, Candice, convinces Amanda to let her stay temporarily as she has nowhere else to go. Then, Jennifer, Amanda's childhood friend, arrives unexpectedly. Eventually, Amanda allows the obnoxious Shelley to move in, splitting the rent with her, as she is the only one who can afford it, thanks to her wealthy family.

Episodes often centred on Shelley ordering the others around because they relied on her to get the rent paid; early episodes often incorporated Candice's latest invented illness, or any other reason to not pay the rent.

Cast and characters
 Amanda Ripley (Dawn French): A strait-laced feminist, socialist, and anarchist, and the central character around whom the series is based. Amanda is generally the most level-headed of the group, but tries to hide her fascination with men and the Royal family to comedic effect, with her hiding copies of Playgirl magazine becoming a running gag in the second series. She works at a feminist magazine titled Spare Cheeks.
 Jennifer Marsh (Jennifer Saunders): A mousy and childlike woman who was Amanda's childhood friend and serves as the whipping post for everyone else. In the first series, she is implied to be intellectually disabled. In the second series, she seems more intelligent, even briefly working as a stockbroker, but no less naïve. Saunders described Jennifer Marsh as "basically a moronic version of myself when I was twelve." She later credited Wax and Ullman with teaching her "how to write funny" and "how to act funny", respectively.
 Shelley DuPont (Ruby Wax): A struggling actress and the stereotype of a gaudily dressed, rude, loud-mouthed American. The other women only tolerate her and let her live with them due to her hefty trust fund and her agreement to pay the majority of the rent.
 Candice Valentine (Tracey Ullman): A promiscuous, lazy, manipulative gold-digger. Ullman left after the first series due to her first pregnancy; as a result, the character is written out in the first episode of the second series.
 Lady Chloe Carlton (Joan Greenwood): An eccentric elderly romance novelist and the women's landlady. In the first series, she has a taxidermied dog named Josephine, which she believes to be alive.

Guest and recurring stars included:
 Helen Atkinson-Wood as Jane, a worker in a leasing agency ("Four-Play")
 Mark Arden and Stephen Frost as dancers at a club ("C.O.D.")
 Suzanne Bertish, Angela Pleasence, and Harriet Walter as RSC actors ("Mr Yummie Brownie")
 The Beverley Sisters as themselves ("Bring Me More Flamingoes")
 Simon Brint and Rowland Rivron as Shelley's backing band ("Cancel Toast")
 Robbie Coltrane as Morris and Paul Brooke as Lawrence, two kidnappers ("C.O.D.")
 Harry Enfield as Dr. Banks, Candice's doctor ("Mr Fluffy Knows Too Much")
 Katherine Helmond as Goldie DuPont, Shelley's mother ("Mr Yummie Brownie")
 Hugh Laurie as Tom, Amanda's crush ("Big Snogs")
 Helen Lederer as Debbie, a worker in a leasing agency ("Four-Play"), and Felicity, one of Amanda's co-workers ("Big Snogs", "Bring Me More Flamingoes")
 Pauline Melville as Yvonne, Amanda's boss ("Skankin'", "Big Snogs", "Bring Me More Flamingoes")
 Geraldine McNulty as Tina, a friend of Candice's ("Staying Alive" and "Ident: Candy Time")
 Pauline Quirke as Jennifer's supervisor ("Who's Ya Uncle Shelley?")
 Alan Rickman as Dmitri, Candice's boyfriend ("Four-Play"), and the voice of RADA ("Cancel Toast")
 John Sessions as Rodney, a stockbroker ("Who's Ya Uncle Shelley?")
 Arthur Smith as a delivery man ("Lower the Donkey")
 Harriet Thorpe as Chris, another of Amanda's co-workers ("Cancel Toast", "Big Snogs")

Many of the guest stars were fellow members of the Royal Shakespeare Company enlisted by Wax. Wax wanted to write a guest part for Ian McKellen, but it never happened.

Music
The theme tune, like the series' score, was written and performed by Glenn Tilbrook and Chris Difford of the band Squeeze. Originally, the opening theme was sung by the cast (minus Greenwood). Three episodes of series one added an introductory verse sung by Ullman over the end credits. From the second episode of the second series, the opening theme was instead sung by Tilbrook.

Episodes
The transmission dates reflect those in the London ITV region. The first series aired on Wednesdays at 8:30pm, while the second series aired on Thursdays at 9pm.

Series 1 (1985)

Series 2 (1986)

Home media

References

External links
 British Film Institute Screen Online
 

1985 British television series debuts
1986 British television series endings
1980s British sitcoms
ITV sitcoms
Television shows set in London
Television series by ITV Studios
Television series by Fremantle (company)
English-language television shows
Television shows produced by Central Independent Television